Spring Grove Cemetery Chapel is a registered historic building at Spring Grove Cemetery in Cincinnati, Ohio, listed in the National Register on March 3, 1980. It was designed by Samuel Hannaford and Sons.

References

External links
Documentation from the University of Cincinnati

National Register of Historic Places in Cincinnati
Chapels in the United States
Churches in Cincinnati
Samuel Hannaford church buildings